Animals Are Beautiful People (also called Beautiful People) is a 1974 South African nature documentary written, produced, directed, filmed and edited by Jamie Uys, about the wildlife in Southern Africa, presented with comedic elements. It was filmed in the Namib Desert, the Kalahari Desert and the Okavango River and Okavango Delta. It was the recipient of the 1974 Golden Globe Award for Best Documentary Film.

The film, a critical and commercial success, was independently made by Uys, also known for his later African comedy The Gods Must Be Crazy (1980).

General description

The film begins in the Namib desert, with the narrator saying: "You'd think nobody could make a living here." But the film proves the opposite and shows the lives of the animals that live there.
The narrator concludes: "But to the Oryx and the little creatures of the Namib, this waterless, hostile desert is paradise."

The second third of the film shows the rich life in the Okavango River and Okavango Delta (see Marula, below), and the last third of the film focuses on life in the Kalahari desert.

Criticisms

One scene depicts baboons, elephants, giraffes, warthogs and other African animals eating rotten, fermented fruit of the Marula tree. The animals are then intoxicated, and they stagger around to comic effect, before nightfall comes and they fall asleep. In the morning, we see one baboon wake up, disheveled, next to a warthog, and quietly exit the burrow, as not to wake her. Some experts have claimed that some scenes were likely staged; elephants would be too large, for example, and drink too much water (diluting the alcohol) to get intoxicated.

Classical music

The film uses classical music and especially well-known pieces to support a scene. A few examples:
 "Brahms Hungarian Dance No. 5" with acrobatic baboons
 Tchaikovsky's "Waltz of the Flowers", showing the miracle of the blooming desert
 Weber's "Invitation to the Dance" orchestrated by Berlioz, featuring the animals' celebration of Paradise's return
 Smetana's "Die Moldau", throughout the movie, especially during the river scenes
 Franz Liszt's "Les préludes, symphonic poem No.3", near the end of the film, during the cloud formation scene
 Tchaikovsky's "Dance of the Reed Flutes"

Featured species

This incomplete list does include almost all mentioned species.

References

External links
 
 

1974 documentary films
1974 films
Documentary films about nature
Films directed by Jamie Uys
Films shot in South Africa
South African comedy films
South African documentary films
Warner Bros. films
1970s English-language films